The National Evangelical Presbyterian Church of Latakia is a church in Latakia, Syria. It is a member of the Synod of Syria and Lebanon, and with a capacity of around 400, it is one of the biggest churches in Latakia, having approximately 1000 members. Weekly activities in the church include the main Sunday service and Sunday school on Fridays, in addition to Bible study and conferences. The church has many teams for Christian songs, theater, and football games.

History
The National Evangelical Presbyterian Church in Latakia is one of the evangelical churches in Syria  affiliated to the National Evangelical Synod of Syria and Lebanon . In 1856 a large number of Western missionaries came to the Middle East, which was then under Ottoman rule. The missionaries began holding services in a large number of cities and villages in the area and set up schools, using local teachers, near the churches. The first service in Latakia took place in 1859 in a rented house. In 1860 the first boys' school was opened, with kindergarten, elementary, and middle school classes offered.

References
 Home page

Buildings and structures in Latakia
Churches in Syria